Lushan or Lu Shan is a famed mountain and World Heritage Site in Jiangxi, China.

 Lushan City, at the foot of the mountain
 Lianxi District, formerly Lushan District, at the foot of the mountain

Lushan or Lu Shan may also refer to:

 Lushan County, Henan
 Lushan County, Sichuan
 Yiwulü Mountain, also Lüshan, in Beizhen, Liaoning
 Lu Shan (actress) (born 1989), Chinese actress and model
 Mount Lu (Sichuan) (:zh:泸山), mountain in Xichang, Sichuan

See also
 An Lushan